The solidarity tax on airplane tickets (Taxe de solidarité sur les billets d'avion, also known as Chirac Tax) is a surcharge on the civil aviation tax which is destined to finance Unitaid. This tax was initially proposed by Presidents Jacques Chirac of France and Luiz Inácio Lula da Silva of Brazil. It was initially adopted by five founding countries (France, Brazil, United Kingdom, Norway and Chile) during a conference in Paris on September 14, 2005. Nine countries actually implemented this tax: Cameroon, Chile, Congo, France, Madagascar, Mali, Mauritius, Niger and the Republic of Korea. Norway also contributes through its tax on  emissions.

History
The tax was first proposed by French president Jacques Chirac and his Brazilian counterpart Luiz Inácio Lula da Silva. It was later adopted by five countries at the Ministerial conference on innovative development finance held in Paris in February 2005.

On 19 October 2019, the National Assembly adopted the first draft of the 2020 Budget which contained a provision instituting an additional contribution on air travel starting on 1 January 2020. This additional contribution is expected to yield  in yearly revenues which will be attributed to the AFITF to fund public transport projects.

Details
The tax is applied selectively depending on the final destination. Transit passengers are exempt under the following conditions;
The arrival and departure are from the same airport
Maximum of 24 hours between arrival and departure
The final destination is not the same as the airport of origin

The tax depends on the destination, either European Economic Area or outside EEA.

The tax raises approximately 160 million per year and since its introduction has raised over 1 billion.

See also
Air Passenger Duty
German air passenger taxes

References

Aviation in France
Taxation in France